She Was the Other is a 1914 American silent comedy film featuring Mabel Paige and Oliver Hardy.

Plot

Cast
 Ed Lawrence - The Chief
 Oliver Hardy - Cutie (as Babe Hardy)
 Mabel Paige - Helen

See also
 List of American films of 1914
 Oliver Hardy filmography

External links

1914 films
American silent short films
1914 short films
Silent American comedy films
American black-and-white films
1914 comedy films
Films directed by Arthur Hotaling
American comedy short films
1910s American films